Sayxunobod is a district of Sirdaryo Region in Uzbekistan. The capital is the town Sayxun. The district consists of 4 urban-type settlements (Sayxun, Sohil, Shoʻroʻzak, Paxtakon) and 7 rural communities.

References

Districts of Uzbekistan
Sirdaryo Region